Micropterix sikhotealinensis is a species of moth belonging to the family Micropterigidae. It is endemic to Russia where it was described by Margarita Gennadievna Ponomarenko and Eugene Anatolievich Beljaev in 2000.

References

Micropterigidae
Moths described in 2000
Endemic fauna of Russia